Marilyn Corson (born June 6, 1950), later known by her married name Marilyn Whitney, is a Canadian former competitive swimmer who swam in the 1968 Summer Olympics and 1972 Summer Olympics.  At the 1968 Olympics in Mexico City, Corson won a bronze medal as a member of Canada's third-place team in the women's 4x100-metre freestyle relay, together with teammates Angela Coughlan, Elaine Tanner and Marion Lay.

See also
 List of Olympic medalists in swimming (women)

References

1950 births
Living people
Canadian female butterfly swimmers
Canadian female freestyle swimmers
Canadian female medley swimmers
Michigan State Spartans women's swimmers
Olympic bronze medalists for Canada
Olympic bronze medalists in swimming
Olympic swimmers of Canada
Swimmers at the 1967 Pan American Games
Swimmers at the 1968 Summer Olympics
Swimmers at the 1972 Summer Olympics
Medalists at the 1968 Summer Olympics
Pan American Games silver medalists for Canada
Pan American Games bronze medalists for Canada
Pan American Games medalists in swimming
Medalists at the 1967 Pan American Games
Commonwealth Games medallists in swimming
Commonwealth Games silver medallists for Canada
Swimmers at the 1966 British Empire and Commonwealth Games
Medallists at the 1966 British Empire and Commonwealth Games